Livio Bordoli (born 31 August 1963) is a retired Swiss football midfielder and later manager.

References

1963 births
Living people
Swiss men's footballers
FC Zürich players
FC Wettingen players
Swiss Super League players
Association football midfielders
Swiss football managers
FC Locarno managers
FC Wohlen managers
FC Chiasso managers
AC Bellinzona managers
FC Lugano managers
FC Aarau managers
FC Winterthur managers